All Saints' Church is a historic Episcopal church located at 100 Lower Marlboro Road (near the intersection of Southern Maryland Boulevard MD 4 and Solomons Island Road MD 2), in Sunderland, Calvert County, Maryland. All Saint's Parish was one of the thirty original Anglican parishes created in 1692 to encompass the Province of Maryland. In 1693 its first parish church, a log structure, was built on an acre of land called Kemp's Desire donated by Thomas Hillary. This log church was expanded in 1703-1704 and repaired at least 4 times before being replaced on top of the hill between MD routes 4, 262, and 2 by the present brick building.

Built between 1774 and 1777, the present church building is a Georgian structure of Flemish bond brick with random glazed headers. Since All Saint's Parish was part of the established church of the Province of Maryland, the published volumes of the Archives of Maryland contain pertinent documented source material on the building showing that it was built with county taxes while future bishop Thomas Claggett served as its rector.

All Saints' Church was listed on the National Register of Historic Places in 1973.

All Saints' Church remains an active parish in the Episcopal Diocese of Maryland. Its current rector is the Rev. Andrew Rutledge.

Gallery

References

External links

All Saints' history
, including photo from 1978, at Maryland Historical Trust

Waymarking listing for the first All Saints Church
Waymarking listing for present All saints Church

Churches on the National Register of Historic Places in Maryland
Churches completed in 1774
Episcopal church buildings in Maryland
Churches in Calvert County, Maryland
Historic American Buildings Survey in Maryland
18th-century Episcopal church buildings
National Register of Historic Places in Calvert County, Maryland